Mehdiabad or Mahdiabad in Iran may refer to:

Alborz Province
Mehdiabad, Eshtehard, a village in Eshtehard County
Mehdiabad, Savojbolagh, a village in Savojbolagh Count

Chaharmahal and Bakhtiari Province
Mehdiabad, Bazoft, a village in Kuhrang County
Mehdiabad-e Yek, Chaharmahal and Bakhtiari, a village in Kuhrang County

Fars Province
Mehdiabad, Bavanat, a village in Bavanat County
Mehdiabad, Darab, a village in Darab County
Mehdiabad, Eqlid, a village in Eqlid County
Mehdiabad, Fasa, a village in Fasa County
Mehdiabad, Now Bandegan, a village in Fasa County
Mehdiabad, Dorudzan, a village in Marvdasht County
Mehdiabad, Seyyedan, a village in Marvdasht County
Mehdiabad, Shiraz, a village in Shiraz County
Mehdiabad, Derak, a village in Shiraz County

Gilan Province
Mehdiabad, Gilan, a village in Lahijan County

Golestan Province
Mehdiabad, Aliabad, a village in Aliabad County
Mehdiabad, Azadshahr, a village in Azadshahr County
Mehdiabad, Gonbad-e Qabus, a village in Gonbad-e Qabus County

Hamadan Province
Mehdiabad, Hamadan, a village in Hamadan County, Hamadan Province, Iran
Mehdiabad, Malayer, a village in Malayer County, Hamadan Province, Iran

Hormozgan Province
Mehdiabad, Hormozgan, a village in Bandar Abbas County
Mohammadabad, Hajjiabad, a village in Hajjiabad County

Ilam Province
Mehdiabad, Ilam, a village in Ilam County

Isfahan Province
Mehdiabad, Dehaqan, a village in Dehaqan County
Mehdiabad, Isfahan, a village in Isfahan County
Mehdiabad, Sistan, a village in Isfahan County
Mehdiabad, Semirom, a village in Semirom County
Mehdiabad, Tiran and Karvan, a village in Tiran and Karvan County

Kerman Province

Anar County
Mehdiabad-e Amin, a village in Anar County

Anbarabad County

Bam County
Mehdiabad-e Darzin, a village in Bam County

Bardsir County

Fahraj County
Mehdiabad-e Olya, a village in Fahraj County

Jiroft County

Kerman County
Mehdiabad, Ekhtiarabad, a village in Kerman County

Narmashir County
Mehdiabad, Narmashir, a village in Narmashir County

Rafsanjan County
Mehdiabad, Rafsanjan, a village in Rafsanjan County
Mehdiabad, Azadegan, a village in Rafsanjan County
Mehdiabad-e Aminiyan, a village in Rafsanjan County
Mehdiabad-e Sardar, a village in Rafsanjan County
Mehdiabad-e Vahed, a village in Rafsanjan County

Rigan County
Mehdiabad, Rigan, a village in Rigan County

Shahr-e Babak County

Sirjan County
Mehdiabad, Sirjan, a village in Sirjan County
Mehdiabad-e Taqi, a village in Sirjan County
Mehdiabad-e Yek, Kerman, a village in Sirjan County

Zarand County
Mehdiabad, Zarand, a village in Zarand County

Kermanshah Province
Mehdiabad-e Sofla, a village in Kermanshah County

Khuzestan Province
Mehdiabad, Gotvand, a village in Gotvand County
Mehdiabad, Hendijan, a village in Hendijan County
Mehdiabad-e Kalak Shuran, a village in Lali County
Mehdiabad, Shushtar, a village in Shushtar County

Kohgiluyeh and Boyer-Ahmad Province
Mehdiabad-e Khan Ahmad, a village in Basht County
Mehdiabad-e Jalaleh, a village in Dana County

Lorestan Province
Mehdiabad, Khorramabad, a village in Khorramabad County

Markazi Province
Mehdiabad, Delijan, a village in Delijan County
Mehdiabad, Khomeyn, a village in Khomeyn County
Mehdiabad, Komijan, a village in Komijan County
Mehdiabad, Shazand, a village in Shazand County

Mazandaran Province
Mehdiabad, Babol, a village in Babol County
Mehdiabad, Behshahr, a village in Behshahr County
Mehdiabad, Chalus, a village in Chalus County
Mehdiabad, Qaem Shahr, a village in Qaem Shahr County
Mehdiabad, Savadkuh, a village in Savadkuh County
Mahdiabad, Tonekabon, a village in Tonekabon County

North Khorasan Province
Mehdiabad, North Khorasan, a village in Esfarayen County

Qazvin Province
Mehdiabad, Qazvin, a village in Takestan County, Qazvin Province, Iran
Mehdiabad-e Bozorg, a village in Qazvin County, Qazvin Province, Iran

Razavi Khorasan Province
Mehdiabad, Chenaran, a village in Chenaran County
Mehdiabad, Khalilabad, a village in Khalilabad County
Mehdiabad, Darzab, a village in Mashhad County
Mehdiabad, Kenevist, a village in Mashhad County
Mehdiabad, Tus, a village in Mashhad County
Mehdiabad, Nishapur, a village in Nishapur County
Mehdiabad-e Qaleh Now, a village in Nishapur County
Mehdiabad, Rashtkhvar, a village in Rashtkhvar County
Mehdiabad, Torbat-e Jam, a village in Torbat-e Jam County

Semnan Province
Mehdiabad, Damghan, a village in Damghan County
Mehdiabad, Shahrud, a village in Shahrud County
Mehdiabad, Meyami, a village in Meyami County

South Khorasan Province
Mehdiabad, Birjand, a village in Birjand County
Mehdiabad, Boshruyeh, a village in Boshruyeh County
Mehdiabad, Darmian, a village in Darmian County
Mehdiabad, Nehbandan, a village in Nehbandan County
Mehdiabad, Qaen, a village in Qaen County
Mehdiabad, Tabas, a village in Tabas County
Mehdiabad, Dastgerdan, a village in Tabas County

Tehran Province
Mehdiabad, Rey, a village in Rey County
Mehdiabad, Varamin, a village in Varamin County
Mehdiabad, Javadabad, a village in Varamin County

Yazd Province
Mehdiabad, Mehriz, a village in Mehriz County
Mehdiabad, Saduq, a village in Saduq County
Mahdiabad, Aliabad, a village in Taft County
Mehdiabad, Kahduiyeh, a village in Taft County
Mehdiabad, Nasrabad, a village in Taft County
Mehdiabad, Zardeyn, a village in Taft County

Zanjan Province
Mehdiabad, Zanjan, a village in Khodabandeh County